Courtney Kathryn "CoCo" Goodson (born June 19, 1990) is an American soccer defender who last played for Sky Blue FC in the National Women's Soccer League. She previously played for FC Twente in the Dutch Eredivisie Vrouwen.

Early life
Goodson was born in Ramona, California. She attended Cathedral Catholic High School where she was a four-year letterwinner and was named to the All-CIF First Team. She was a member of the CIF San Diego Section and Western League Championship teams from 2005 to 2007. Goodson was named All-North County twice and All-Western League twice. In 2005, she was named California Gatorade Rookie of the Year. In 2007, she was named to the Union-Tribune All-Academic Team.

University of California Irvine
After spending the first two years of her college career at the University of Texas where she played midfielder for the Texas Longhorns, Goodson transferred to the University of California, Irvine where she played for the UCI Anteaters from 2010 to 2011. During her two seasons at Irvine, the squad made it to the NCAA Tournament for the first two times in school history. Her skill helped improve Irvine's possession, elevating the team's scoring production from 37 without Goodson in 2009 to 49 goals during her junior season.

Playing career

Club

FC Twente
After being drafted 12th overall in the 2012 WPS Draft to the Philadelphia Independence and the league folding before the season began, Goodson played for the Dutch professional side, FC Twente. She made 19 starts in 19 matches and scored one goal as a defender for the team.

Sky Blue FC 
In 2013, Goodson was drafted to Sky Blue FC during the third round of the 2013 NWSL Supplemental Draft (21st overall) for the inaugural season of the National Women's Soccer League.  During her second cap with the team playing the defender position, she scored her first goal in a match against the Washington Spirit helping her team secure a 2–1 win. Goodson ended the 2013 season having started in all 23 games that she played for Sky Blue and scored one goal.

References

External links

 Courtney Goodson profile at National Women's Soccer League
 CoCo Goodson profile at Sky Blue FC
 UCI player profile
 Texas player profile
 

1990 births
Living people
American women's soccer players
National Women's Soccer League players
NJ/NY Gotham FC players
Texas Longhorns women's soccer players
UC Irvine Anteaters women's soccer players
Soccer players from California
Women's association football defenders
FC Twente (women) players
Expatriate women's footballers in the Netherlands
American expatriate sportspeople in the Netherlands
Eredivisie (women) players
People from Ramona, San Diego County, California
Sportspeople from San Diego County, California